Javier "Javi" Navarro Rodríguez (born 1 January 1997) is a Spanish footballer who plays as a left winger.

Club career
Born in Barcelona, Catalonia, Navarro represented RCD Espanyol, UE Cornellà and CE Vila Olímpica before joining Málaga CF in July 2015. On 7 September 2016, after finishing his formation, he joined Tercera División side CE Europa, and made his senior debut during the campaign.

On 13 June 2017, despite struggling with injuries, Navarro signed a new one-year deal with the Escapulats. The following 31 January, he was transferred to Cádiz CF and was assigned to the reserves also in the fourth division.

Navarro made his first team debut for the Andalusians on 18 August 2019; after coming on as a half-time substitute for Jon Ander Garrido, he scored the equalizer in a 3–1 home defeat of SD Ponferradina in the Segunda División. The following 29 January, he moved to the latter club on loan for the remainder of the season.

On 16 September 2020, Navarro joined fellow second division side Albacete Balompié, on loan for one year. The following 18 January, after suffering a knee injury, his loan was cut short, and his contract was terminated on 13 July 2021.

References

External links

Javi Navarro profile at Cadistas1910 

1997 births
Living people
Footballers from Barcelona
Spanish footballers
Association football wingers
Segunda División players
Segunda División B players
Tercera División players
CE Europa footballers
Cádiz CF B players
Cádiz CF players
SD Ponferradina players
Albacete Balompié players